The 2022–23 Thai League 3 Bangkok metropolitan region is a region in the regional stage of the 2022–23 Thai League 3. The tournament was sponsored by Kongsalak Plus, and known as the Kongsalak Plus League for sponsorship purposes. A total of 14 teams located in Bangkok metropolitan region and Central of Thailand will compete in the league of the Bangkok metropolitan region.

Teams

Number of teams by province

Stadiums and locations

Foreign players
A T3 team could register 3 foreign players from foreign players all around the world. A team can use 3 foreign players on the field in each game.
Note :: players who released during second leg transfer window;: players who registered during second leg transfer window.
{|class="unsortable"
|-
| style="width:15px; background:#ffdddd;"| ||Other foreign players.
|-
| style="width:15px; background:#ffffdd;"| ||AFC member countries players.
|-
| style="width:15px; background:#ddffdd;"| ||ASEAN member countries players.
|-
| style="width:15px; background:#c8ccd1;"| ||No foreign player registered.
|}

League table

Standings

Positions by round

Results by round

Results

References

External links
 Official website of Thai League

Thai League 3
3